Qatar competed at several editions of the World Games.

History 

In 2005, Qatar won its first medal at the World Games in Duisburg, Germany and both medals were won in bodybuilding. In 2009, Kamal Abdulsalam Abdulrahman won a medal in bodybuilding at the 2009 World Games but he was stripped of his medal in 2011 after testing positive for a banned substance. Eight years later, at the 2017 World Games held in Wrocław, Poland, Qatar won a bronze medal in beach handball. At the 2022 World Games, the country won the silver medal in the men's beach handball tournament.

Medal count

References 

 
Nations at the World Games